This is a list of airports in Kazakhstan, sorted by location.



Airports 

Airport names shown in bold indicate the facility has scheduled passenger service on a commercial airline.

See also 
 Transport in Kazakhstan
 List of airports by ICAO code: U#Kazakhstan
 Wikipedia: WikiProject Aviation/Airline destination lists: Asia#Kazakhstan

References 

 
 
  – includes IATA codes
 
 

 
Kazakhstan
Airports
Airports
Kazakhstan
Kazakhstan